The edible-nest swiftlet (Aerodramus fuciphagus), also known as the white-nest swiftlet, is a small bird of the swift family which is found in Southeast Asia. Its opaque and whitish bird nest is made exclusively of solidified saliva and is the main ingredient of bird's nest soup, a delicacy of Chinese cuisine.

Description 

The edible-nest swiftlet, generally with a body length of 14cm (5.5. in), is a medium-sized representative of the salangans. The upper part of the slender body is blackish-brown; the under part of the body ranges in colour from white to blackish-brown. The tail is short and has a slight notch. The bill and feet are black. Legs are very short and tarsi are usually unfeathered or lightly feathered. 

It weighs 15 to 18 grams  and the wings are long and narrow. In flight the swept-back wings resemble a crescent.  

The subspecies A. f. micans is paler and greyer while A. f. vestitus is darker with a rump that is less obviously paler.

Distribution and subspecies
This species is present in the Andamans, in the coasts of South-East Asia and in the Indonesian Archipelago. The range is quite extensive, but highly fragmented.

There are six subspecies of the edible-nest swiftlet:

Aerodramus fuciphagus fuciphagus – The nominate subspecies found in Java, Bali and the western Lesser Sunda Islands
Aerodramus fuciphagus inexpectatus – Andaman and Nicobar Islands, vagrant to Burma
Aerodramus fuciphagus dammermani – Flores, known from only a single specimen
Aerodramus fuciphagus micans – eastern Lesser Sundas (Sumba, Savu and Timor)
Aerodramus fuciphagus vestitus – Sumatra and Borneo, sometimes considered to be a separate species, the brown-rumped swiftlet, Aerodramus vestitus (Lesson, 1843).
Aerodramus fuciphagus perplexus – Maratua Archipelago off eastern Borneo

Germain's swiftlet (Aerodramus germani), with two subspecies germani and amechanus, was formerly considered to be conspecific with the edible-nest swiftlet, but is now often considered to be a separate species. It occurs in the Malay Peninsula, central Thailand, coastal Vietnam and Cambodia, Hainan, northern Borneo and parts of the Philippines.

Behavior

The edible-nest swiftlet feeds over a range of habitats from coastal areas to the mountains, occurring up to 2,800 metres above sea-level on Sumatra and Borneo. These birds generally occur above forests, the forest edge, but also in open country.

These birds spend most of their lives in the air. Its diet consists of flying insects which are caught on the wing.  They also drink on the wing. They often feed in large flocks with other species of swiftlet and swallow.

It breeds in colonies in coastal areas, in limestone caves, in rock crevices,  in a cleft in a cliff or sometimes on a building. The bracket-shaped nest is built on a vertical surface and the long legs are used for clinging. These swifts never settle voluntarily on the ground. The nest is white and translucent and is made of layers of hardened saliva attached to the rock. 

It measures about 6 cm across with a depth of 1.5 cm and a weight of about 14 grams. Two white, oval, non-glossy eggs are laid.

At breeding colonies, the bird emits high-pitched and burbling calls. They also emit a rattling call used for echolocation, which enables them to look for their nesting sites in the darkness of caves.

Threats and conservation

The nest used in bird's nest soup is composed entirely of saliva. The soup is made by soaking and steaming the nests in water. It is said to improve kidney health, reduce phlegm, and to be an aphrodisiac. The nests can fetch high prices and many colonies are harvested commercially.

Some populations such as those in the Andaman and Nicobar Islands have been harvested extensively leading to them being considered critically threatened under the IUCN criteria.

The use of artificial bird houses is growing. A detailed account of modern nest farming and marketing techniques is given by David Jordan (2004). 

In Indonesia and Malaysia, "farming" of nests is performed in purpose-built structures or old empty houses with "tweeters" playing recordings of bird calls on the roof to attract swiftlets. In urban areas, such "bird houses" may be considered a nuisance by neighbours due to the loud bird calls and bird feces.

References

Further reading
 MacKinnon, John & Phillipps, Karen (1993) A Field Guide to the Birds of Borneo, Sumatra, Java and Bali, Oxford University Press, Oxford.
 Manchi, Shirish S.; Sankaran, Ravi (2010). Foraging habits and habitat use by edible nest and glossy swiftlets in the Andsman Islands The Wilson Journal of Ornithology. 122 (2): 259–272. ISSN 1559-4491.
 Robson, Craig (2002) A Field Guide to the Birds of South-East Asia, New Holland Publishers (UK) Ltd., London.

External links

Oriental Bird Images: Edible-nest Swiftlet
Review of Scientific Research on Edible Bird's Nest

edible-nest swiftlet
Birds of Southeast Asia
Cave birds
edible-nest swiftlet